The Harman River is a river of New Zealand. It starts in the Browning Range of the Southern Alps and becomes the Arahura River, which flows into the Tasman Sea north of Hokitika.

The river can be reached on foot using the Styx Valley track.

The river is named for R.J.S. Harman, a Canterbury surveyor, who discovered the nearby Harman Pass in 1865.

See also
List of rivers of New Zealand

References

Land Information New Zealand - Search for Place Names

Westland District
Rivers of the West Coast, New Zealand
Rivers of New Zealand